Huguccio (Hugh of Pisa, Uguccio) (c. 1140- died 1210) was an Italian canon lawyer.

Biography 
Huguccio studied at Bologna, probably under Gandolphus, and taught canon law in the same city, perhaps in the school connected with the monastery of SS. Nabore e Felice. He is believed to have become Bishop of Ferrara in 1190.

Among his supposed pupils was Lotario de' Conti, afterwards Pope Innocent III, who held him in high esteem as is shown by the important cases which the pontiff submitted to him, traces of which still remain in the "Corpus Juris" (c. Coram, 34, X, I, 29). Two letters addressed by Innocent III to Huguccio were inserted in the Decretals of Gregory IX (c. Quanto, 7, X, IV, 19; c. In quadam, 8, X,III,41).  However, Innocent probably was not well acquainted with Huguccio's ideas on the Eucharist when he issued the decretal Cum Marthae (X 3.41.16).

He wrote a "Summa" on the "Decretum" of Gratian, concluded according to some in 1187, according to others after 1190, the most extensive and perhaps the most authoritative commentary of that time. He omits, however, in the commentary the second part of the Causae of the Decretum of Gratian, Causae xxiii-xxvi, a gap which was filled by Johannes de Deo.

Huguccio argued, in a widely known opinion, that a pope who fell into heresy automatically lost his see, without the necessity of a formal judgment.

Along with Gratian's Decretum, Huguccio's Summa contains opinions (i.e. Causa 27, quaestio 1, chapter 23, ad v; Distinction 23, chapter 25; Causa 33, quaestio 5, chapter 13) about deaconesses, women, and hermaphrodites.

Huguccio the grammarian
Huguccio the canon lawyer has traditionally been identified with the grammarian Huguccio Pisanus (Hugh of Pisa; Italian Uguccione da Pisa). The grammarian's principal work was the Magnae Derivationes or Liber derivationum, which dealt with etymologies, and was based on the earlier Derivationes of Osbernus of Gloucester. This identification of the two Huguccios as the same man dates back to a short biography compiled by the Italian historian Mauro Sarti, published posthumously in 1769. However, it has been challenged by Wolfgang Müller. While there is too little biographical evidence to be certain either way, Müller argues that the canon lawyer who went on to become Bishop of Ferrara is to be distinguished from the grammarian who was born in Pisa.

Further reading
 Charles de Miramon, “Innocent III, Huguccio de Ferrare et Hubert de Pirovano: Droit canonique, théologie et philosophie à Bologne dans les années 1180,” in Medieval Church Law and the Origins of the Western Legal Tradition. A Tribute to Kenneth Pennington, ed. Wolfgang P. Müller and Mary E. Sommar, Washington, D. C.: Catholic University of America Press, 2006, 320-346.
 Wilfried Hartmann and Kenneth Pennington, The history of medieval canon law in the classical period, 1140-1234, Washington, D. C.: Catholic University of America Press, 2008.

References

External links
 

1210 deaths
Canon law jurists
Bishops of Ferrara
12th-century Italian Roman Catholic bishops
13th-century Italian Roman Catholic bishops
Year of birth unknown
12th-century Italian jurists
12th-century Italian writers
12th-century Latin writers